Amihan is a genderless deity that is depicted as a bird in the Philippine mythology. According to the Tagalog folklore, Amihan is the first creature to inhabit the universe, along with the gods called Bathala and Aman Sinaya. In the legend Amihan is described as a bird who saves the first human beings, Malakas and Maganda from a bamboo plant.

Amihan is also depicted with Habagat which explains the wind patterns in the country. In one legend they are depicted as children of the supreme deity Bathala. They are allowed by their father to play in turns per half a year since having the two play together causes destruction in the land. Amihan is depicted as the gentler sister while Habagat is depicted as the more active brother. In another legend, Amihan is depicted as a giant who is at war with another giant Habagat.

References

Sky and weather deities
Animal deities
Creator deities
Tagalog deities
Legendary birds
Androgynous and hermaphroditic deities